A bench seat is a full width continuous pad forming the front seat of automobiles.  The second row of seating in most sedans is usually a bench. The third row of most SUVs and minivans, which may be forward-facing or rear-facing, is also a bench seat.

Design
The front bench seat typically allowed three people to sit abreast, or six passengers in most four-door sedans with this type of arrangement. For example, "although advertised as an economical 'compact' car, the [1952] Willys Aero could comfortably sit three abreast on its front and rear bench seats, and deliver excellent fuel economy." Nash Motors introduced the unique "airliner" reclining front bench seats that would be transformed into a bed. American Motors promoted its exclusive adjustable bench seats on the 1959 Ramblers and Ambassadors featuring several restful positions, including a "comfortable nap couch for children and older adults." In 1972, the Jeep Commando's center console for the automatic transmission was replaced with a steering column mounted shifter, "making the much-requested bench seat an option." The " innovative but unusual " 1975 AMC Pacer introduced numerous designs that included the "cab forward" and "room for three upfront on the bench seat."

The bucket seat arrangement leaves a space between the two front seats, usually occupied by a shifter and hand brake. Originally, bucket seats were associated with imported cars in the 1950s and 1960s. The Volkswagen Bus was originally available with three rows of bench seats seating up to nine passengers, but since then most minivans have been configured to seat seven or eight with front bucket seats.

In Australia, the Holden Kingswood, Ford Falcon and Chrysler Valiant were fitted with bench seats for many years. To this day, the Falcon Ute is still offered with a bench seat and column shift in the front, and availability of a front bench seat in the Falcon sedan and wagon lineups was only discontinued with the introduction of the FG Falcon in 2008. Holden offered a bench seat on the Commodore in the 1990s, originating with the VG Ute and ending with the end of VS series III production in 2000.

Part of the success of the Chrysler K-cars, the Dodge Aries and the Plymouth Reliant, was that by retaining front bench seating rather than adopting bucket seats usually fitted to compacts, they could still function as the six passenger cars they were designed to replace and compete against.

Because the shifter and parking brake cannot be mounted between the seats, the transmission selector or shifter is moved to the steering column, and the emergency brake is activated by a pedal in the driver's footwell. 

The traditional sedans with full-width bench seating offered nearly the same passenger capacity as the newer three-row SUV or minivan. Some models, such as the Chrysler Pacifica, feature a center console in the second row, rather than room for a passenger in the middle.

Decline  
Even in the United States, the bucket seat has largely replaced the bench seat; the bucket is viewed as "sportier", and smaller cars have made the middle position less viable.  For high performance cars, bucket seats help keep the driver in place during cornering.  Some pickup and larger trucks are still available with bench seats which would only be able to seat two if bucket seats were fitted, though some extended and crew cabs retain them to keep costs down since separate availability of bucket seats (captain's chairs) adds to the parts cost.

Until around the mid 1990s, bench seats still predominated in large American premium sedans and minivans, but even in this market they have become rare. The Toyota Avalon is among some of the newest models to drop availability of this feature, and models such as the Buick LeSabre replaced by new models such as the Buick Lucerne and Cadillac DTS in which it is offered as an option.  They were standard equipment on the Ford Crown Victoria, Mercury Grand Marquis, and Lincoln Town Car until they were discontinued in 2011. As of 2013, it was reported that only one American automobile, the Chevrolet Impala was sold with a bench seat, and the option was terminated in the next model year.  The front bench seat also declined due to safety concerns as air bags could only protect two front seat passengers (an exception being the Cadillac Air Bank system, dating back to the early 1990s, in which the passenger side air bag is significantly larger than the driver side air bag is, so it can protect the middle passenger in a frontal crash).

References 

Auto parts